Worcester Summit is the crest of a ridge rising to about 2,030 m at the east end of Jaeger Table, Dufek Massif, in the Pensacola Mountains of Antarctica. It was named by the Advisory Committee on Antarctic Names (US-ACAN) in 1979 after Robin D. Worcester who, with David W. Bennett, comprised the first of the annual United States Geological Survey (USGS) satellite surveying teams at the South Pole Station during the winter of 1973.

Mountains of Queen Elizabeth Land
Pensacola Mountains